The 2022–23 Second League is the 67th season of the Second League, the second tier of the Bulgarian football league system, and the 7th season under this name and current league structure.

For this season, the league was reduced from 20 to 18 teams, with four teams relegated to Third League, five teams promoted from Third League and three teams promoted to First League.

Teams
The following teams have changed division since the 2021–22 season.

To Second League 

Promoted from Third League
 Dunav Ruse
 Spartak Pleven
 Krumovgrad
 Belasitsa Petrich
 Vitosha Bistritsa

Relegated from First League
 None

From Second League 
Relegated to Third League
 Levski Lom
 Neftochimic Burgas
 Marek Dupnitsa
 Septemvri Simitli

Promoted to First League
 Septemvri Sofia
 Hebar
 Spartak Varna

Stadia and locations

Personnel and sponsorship
Note: Flags indicate national team as has been defined under FIFA eligibility rules. Players and managers may hold more than one non-FIFA nationality.

Note: Individual clubs may wear jerseys with advertising. However, only one sponsorship is permitted per jersey for official tournaments organised by UEFA in addition to that of the kit manufacturer (exceptions are made for non-profit organisations).
Clubs in the domestic league can have more than one sponsorship per jersey which can feature on the front of the shirt, incorporated with the main sponsor or in place of it; or on the back, either below the squad number or on the collar area. Shorts also have space available for advertisement.

Managerial changes

League table

Results

Results by round

Positions by round

References 

2022-23
2
Bul
Current association football seasons